The Rača Bridge is an international bridge over the Sava river, from Sremska Rača in Serbia to Bosanska Rača in Bosnia and Herzegovina.

The Bridge of Maria of Yugoslavia (Мост краљице Марије) was opened on 28 June 1934. The bridge was built by mainly Italian workers.

On September 6, 2010, the Serbian government and Milorad Dodik opened the new Bridge of Europe (Мост Европа), a road bridge built just to the west of the Maria Bridge. Boris Tadić said he hoped the bridge would further bring closer the peoples of both sides of the Sava river, contributing economically Serbia and the Republika Srpska entity.

See also 
 List of bridges in Serbia

References 

Bridges over the Sava in Bosnia and Herzegovina
Bridges over the Sava in Serbia
Transport in Vojvodina
Bridges completed in 1934
International bridges
1934 establishments in Yugoslavia